François Joseph Uchard  (30 October 1809, Paris - 16 February 1891, Paris), known as Joseph Uchard, was a French architect. His projects include the completion of Saint-François Xavier des Missions étrangères.

External links

1809 births
1891 deaths
19th-century French architects